The AfroCan (alternatively known as the FIBA AfroCan) is a men's basketball continental competition in Africa, which is played biennially under the auspices of FIBA (International Basketball Federation), basketball's international governing body, and the FIBA African zone thereof. Unlike the AfroBasket, AfroCan is only opened to all players who play for basketball clubs based in Africa.

History 
In 2017, a new calendar by FIBA changed the AfroBasket from a biennial to quadrennial tournament. As a consequence, the AfroCan was created to vill up the void.

The first ever AfroCan was held in 2019 in Mali, with DR Congo winning the inaugural title after beating Kenya in the final.

Summaries

Performances by nation

Participation details

Most Valuable Player

See also
AfroBasket

References

External links
 FIBA Africa website

 
Basketball competitions in Africa between national teams
Recurring sporting events established in 2019